Soichi Hashimoto (Japanese: 橋本壮市; born 24 August 1991) is a Japanese judoka. Hashimoto is currently ranked first in the lightweight division.

Hashimoto rose to prominence by becoming national champion at the All-Japan Judo Championships in 2015. He then became one of the lightweight division's top judokas by winning five tournaments consecutively, spanning from the World Masters to the Grand Slam Tokyo and Paris.

He is known for his dynamic style of judo and strong groundwork.

Career

2015 Grand Prix Qingdao
Hashimoto's first opponent in Qingdao was Bang Gui-man of Korea. It was a heavy fight for grips, with many penalties on both sides. However, despite both being level with three shidos each, Bang was penalised for the fourth time and awarded hansoku make, bringing Hashimoto through to his second fight.

He then faced American Nicholas Delpopolo, in a relatively equal match, with only a yuko separating them when Hashimoto attacked with an osoto gari. Even though the throw was relegated from ippon, it was enough to send the Japanese to the quarter-final.

Hashimoto made short work of his opponent, Italian Enrico Parlati, pressuring the latter to be penalised for a false attack with a drop seoi nage in the early seconds of the fight. Hashimoto then threw Parlati with a seoi nage for ippon in just 30 seconds.

He again showed a masterclass in the semi-final against Giyosjon Boboev of Uzbekistan, again pressuring the latter to make a false attack with a drop seoi nage just 12 seconds in. Hashimoto unsuccessfully attempted a drop seoi otoshi, however he managed to bring the fight to the ground. He finished the fight by ippon with a signature juji gatame.

In the final, Hashimoto was against top-ranked Rustam Orujov. He scored ippon with a seoi nage in a little over a minute, winning the tournament's gold medal.

Rise to prominence: Undefeated run since 2016 till 2018

2016 Masters Guadalajara
At the invitation-only Masters, Hashimoto faced Sainjargalyn Nyam-Ochir in his first fight. It was a smaller group of fighters as the event was only months away from the 2016 Olympics. The bout was shido-filled, both fighters having been penalised for false attacks and passivity. However, Hashimoto pulled through when Sainjargalyn was penalised with a third shido.

He then faced Israeli Sagi Muki, in another tight, shido-dominated fight. Over two minutes into the bout, Hashimoto scored a wazaari with an osoto gari. Despite being penalised for avoiding grip twice following the score, he was through to the semi-finals as Muki failed to score.

Hashimoto was against rival Orujov for a place in the final. Another tactical fight ensued, with only a shido separating them. Hashimoto's opponent for the gold medal was Ganbaataryn Odbayar. He showed a newaza masterclass with an unusual juji-gatame for ippon. IJF commentators remarked that the armbar was reminiscent of Brazilian jiu-jitsu than judo. They speculate that Hashimoto had trained in BJJ.

2016 Grand Slam Tokyo
Hashimoto was against Lee Fengmao of Taiwan in Round 2. He caught Lee with an ippon seoi nage a minute and a half into the fight, and scored wazaari. He then connected to a yoko shiho gatame for ippon. In the following fight, he faced Boboev who was ready for a tactical battle. Hashimoto succeeded when Boboev picked up a second shido for passivity. Hashimoto carried on with a tactical strategy as he went against countryman Arata Tatsukawa in the semi-final. He also won by a single shido, controlling the grips and causing Tatsukawa to be defensive.

The final was set against Takeshi Doi in another level fight. Doi tried to bring the fight to the ground in the opening moments of the bout, and fought with a lasso guard as Hashimoto remained in a stand-up stance while attempting osaekomi. He then managed to break Doi's guard as Doi rolled to his front, which Hashimoto followed with an unsuccessful juji gatame attempt. The fight then varied between newaza and fighting for grips. Doi then lost the final by stepping outside the tatami, giving the gold medal to Hashimoto.

In 2021, he won the silver medal in his event at the 2021 Judo World Masters held in Doha, Qatar.

References

External links
 

1991 births
Living people
Tokai University alumni
Japanese male judoka
Sportspeople from Shizuoka Prefecture
World judo champions